This is a list of life peerages in the peerage of the United Kingdom created under the Appellate Jurisdiction Act 1876. On 1 October 2009, the Appellate Jurisdiction Act 1876 was repealed by Schedule 18 to the Constitutional Reform Act 2005 owing to the creation of the Supreme Court of the United Kingdom. As a result, the power to create law life peers lapsed, although the validity of life peerages created thereunder remains intact.

1870s

‡ former MP

1880s

‡ former MP

1890s

‡ former MP  § former Senator of the College of Justice

1900s

‡ former MP

1910s

‡ former MP

1920s

‡ former MP

1930s

1940s

‡ former MP  § former Senator of the College of Justice

1950s

‡ former MP  § former Senator of the College of Justice

1960s

‡ former MP  § former Senator of the College of Justice

1970s

§ former Senator of the College of Justice

1980s

§ former Senator of the College of Justice

1990s

§ former Senator of the College of Justice

2000s

Law life peers subsequently created hereditary peers

‡ former MP

Other peers who served as Law Lords

Hereditary peers

‡ former MP

Peers created under the Life Peerages Act 1958

‡ former MP

List of Lords of Appeal in Ordinary
This is a complete list of people who have been appointed a Lord of Appeal in Ordinary under the terms of the Appellate Jurisdiction Act 1876. On 1 October 2009, the Lords Appeal in Ordinary became the first Justices of the Supreme Court of the United Kingdom.

Those appointees who were not already members of the House of Lords were created life peers; for their titles see above. Initially it was intended that peers created in this way would only sit in the House of Lords while serving their term as judges, but in 1887 (on the retirement of Lord Blackburn) the Appellate Jurisdiction Act 1887 provided that former judges would retain their seats for life. Under the terms of the Constitutional Reform Act 2005, which transferred the judicial functions of the House of Lords to the new Supreme Court, previous Law Lords who were transferred to the Supreme Court do not have the right to speak and vote in the House until they leave office.

See also
Armorial of Lords of Appeal

References

Notes

Citations

Sources
 Chris Cook and Brendan Keith, British Historical Facts 1830–1900, Macmillan, 1975
 David Butler and Gareth Butler, Twentieth-Century British Political Facts 1900–2000, Macmillan, 2000
 Sir John Sainty, "The Judges of England 1272–1990", Selden Society 1993

External links
United Kingdom peerage creations 1801 to 2011 - "Chronological list 1801–2011" (David Beamish)
United Kingdom peerage creations 1801 to 2011 - "Other peerages since 1 August 1958" (David Beamish)
United Kingdom peerage creations 1801 to 2011 - "Lords of Appeal in Ordinary 1876–2009" (David Beamish)

 
 
Law life peerages
Law life peerages